Juan Sánchez Muñoz (born 1967) is the fourth Chancellor for the University of California, Merced. Previously before coming to Merced Muñoz served as President of the University of Houston - Downtown. He is the schools first Hispanic chancellor, son of farmer workers, and a California native. He is on the board of directors for numerous community and nonprofits organizations including the Excelencia in Education, Gallo Center for the Arts, Bay Area Council, and the Yosemite Conservancy. Additionally he has served the California Governors Council for Post-Secondary Education on the Fresno K-16 Collaborative which aimed to increase the number of undergraduate degrees earned by residents in the Greater Fresno area.

He served in the United States Marine Corp Reserves and was honorably discharged at the rank of sergeant.

References 

University of California, Merced
Chancellors of campuses of the University of California
Living people
American academics of Mexican descent
University of California, Santa Barbara alumni
United States Marine Corps reservists
California State University, Los Angeles alumni
University of California, Los Angeles alumni
United States Marine Corps personnel of the Gulf War
1967 births